Abia State elections in 2023 will be on 25 February, 11 March, and 28 April 2023. As a part of the nationwide election, the state will vote for President and Vice President on 25 February. Additionally, there will also be elections on the same day for the Senate and the House of Representatives. On 11 March, the election for Governor of Abia State will be held alongside elections to the state House of Assembly. Local government elections are scheduled for 28 April.

Federal elections

Presidential election 

Abia State will vote for President of Nigeria alongside the Senate and House of Representatives elections on 25 February 2023.

National Assembly elections

Senate elections 

All 3 Abia State seats in the Senate of Nigeria will be up for election alongside the presidential and House of Representatives elections on 25 February 2023.

House of Representatives elections 

All 8 Abia State seats in the House of Representatives of Nigeria will be up for election alongside the presidential and Senate elections on 25 February 2023.

State elections

Gubernatorial election

House of Assembly elections 

All 24 seats in the Abia State House of Assembly will be up for election alongside the gubernatorial elections on 11 March 2023.

Local elections 

The Abia State Independent Electoral Commission called local elections for 28 April.

Notes

References 

Abia State elections
2023 Abia State elections